The Portuguese Republican Party was a Portuguese political party formed during the late years of the constitutional monarchy that proposed and conducted the substitution of the monarchy with the Portuguese First Republic.

When the Republic was established on the 5 October 1910 Revolution, the members of the party initially stood together, but soon began splitting into different parties, including the Democratic Party, Democratic Leftwing Republican Party, Reformist Party, Republican Union, Evolutionist Party, Centrist Republican Party, Popular Party, Radical Party, Republican Liberal Party, Liberal Republican Union, Reconstitution Party and Nationalist Republican Party.

Notable members
Afonso Costa
José Relvas
Teófilo Braga
Manuel de Arriaga

See also

Timeline of Portuguese history

References

Defunct political parties in Portugal
Liberal parties in Portugal
Radical parties
Republican parties
Republicanism in Portugal
Political parties established in 1876
Political parties disestablished in 1911
1876 establishments in Portugal
1911 disestablishments in Portugal